Karl Groß can refer to:

 Karl Groß (footballer)
 Karl Groß (wrestler)